Petar Ivanov Angelov (born 29 March 1932) is a Bulgarian alpine skier. He competed in three events at the 1956 Winter Olympics.

References

External links
 

1932 births
Living people
Bulgarian male alpine skiers
Olympic alpine skiers of Bulgaria
Alpine skiers at the 1956 Winter Olympics
People from Samokov
Sportspeople from Sofia Province